Melsomvik is a village in the municipality of Sandefjord, Norway, which lies by the Tønsberg Fjord. Its population is 2,076 as of 2016. It has been a boat harbor since Medieval times when the Leidang fleet was located in Melsomvik. When the conflict with Sweden escalated and fears of war were imminent, the Royal Norwegian Navy was relocated from Horten to Melsomvik as Melsomvik was a better-protected location. Melsomvik remained an important site for the Norwegian Armed Forces until the 1960s. During the age of sailships there was much activity in Melsomvik, and it was also where the Navy laid their ships up in the years 1898-1964. Whale-catchers were also harbored in the hamlet of Melsomvik. Melsomvik experiences significant summer tourism and is home to many vacation homes.

An agricultural school was established at Melsom on April 30, 1957, known as Vestfold Landbruksskole. This school changed names to Melsom Secondary School in 1994. Melsomvik is also home to Oslofjord Convention Center, formerly known as Brunstad Conference Center, which was established in 2003. It is owned and operated by Brunstad Christian Church (“Smith’s Friends”) and has a capacity of 9,000 guests in its 2,400 rooms.

The neighboring village of Storevar was annexed into Melsomvik in 2016. Melsomvik was previously a part of Stokke municipality, but became a village in Sandefjord municipality on January 1, 2017.

Description

Melsomvik is known for its architecture which resembles that of Southern Norway. It has been an active harbor since the Middle Ages. The Norwegian Armed Forces maintained in control of its harbor until 1964. A coastal hiking trail can be found along the coast from Brunstad to Storevar. Remains from German fortifications can be seen along the coast, and burial mounds dated to the Iron Age can be found at Trælsodden. Melsomvik is also home of Oslofjord Convention Center, which is owned by Brunstad Christian Church and has a seating capacity for up to 6,800 people. The large convention center has also been home to Arctic Equestrian Games, the largest horse show in Norway. It has an overnight capacity of 800 and is also the home of a separate campground. Brunstad in northern Melsomvik is also home to a municipal beach, and various convenience stores and a seafood restaurant are open during summers near the beach at Brunstad.

Sundås Fort

A defunct fort can be seen at the 87-meter Sundåsen, south of Storevar in the former Stokke municipality (now Sandefjord). It lies by Bogen and offers panoramic surrounding views of the Swedish coastline in the east and the Skrim mountains in the west. Forts were constructed at both Sundåsen and Håøya, meant to protect the former marine harbor found in Melsomvik. Melsomvik became a marine harbor in the late 1800s and was home to modern fortifications equipped with canons for protection. The fort at Sundåsen was constructed during turbulent times with Sweden, during the Union between Sweden and Norway, and the fort was erected to prevent a potential Swedish invasion. Most of the fort at Sundåsen has been removed, but remains can still be seen, including three concrete gun pits overlooking the Tønsberg Fjord.

Recreation
Stokke has a 14-kilometer coastline with a varied landscape. Much of its coastal trails can be found in Melsomvik and are parts of the international North Sea Trail, a network of 5000 km of international hiking trails surrounding the North Sea. In the inner parts of Melsomvik Bay is Melsomvik Plant and Wildlife Refuge. This 39 ha. (9.6 acre) reserve was established in 2006 and is home to a variety of oak and broad-leaved tree species along with vulnerable wildlife species.

Grave mounds dating to the Iron Age can be seen at Trælsodden. At this time, the ocean levels were 4-5 meters (13-16 ft.) higher and the mounds were situated closer to the sea. At Trælsodden, remains from battlements and trenches may also be found, constructed by the Germans during World War II.

References

Villages in Vestfold og Telemark